The white-winged dog-like bat (Peropteryx leucoptera) is a bat species found in northern Brazil, southeastern Colombia, Ecuador, French Guiana, Guyana, eastern Peru, Suriname, and Venezuela.

References

Emballonuridae
Bats of South America
Bats of Brazil
Mammals of Colombia
Mammals described in 1867
Taxa named by Wilhelm Peters